The following list includes notable people who were born or have lived in Providence, Rhode Island.

Arts, literature, humanities and entertainment

 Tom Adams, illustrator most famous for his Agatha Christie paperback cover designs 
 Daniel Adel, painter and illustrator
 Chester Holmes Aldrich, architect and director of American Academy in Rome
 David Aldrich, artist and architect
 Mathuren Arthur Andrieu, painter
 Omar Bah, journalist and founder of the Refugee Dream Center
 Mildred Barker, Shaker eldress, musician, and scholar who lived at the Alfred and Sabbathday Lake Shaker communities
 Joe Bastardi, meteorologist
 Joe Beats, hip-hop producer
 Ted Berrigan, poet
 Blu Cantrell, singer of 2001 hit "Hit 'Em Up Style (Oops)"
 William Carpenter, early settler of Providence
 Marilyn Chambers (1952–2009), adult-film actress
 Damien Chazelle, director and screenwriter, Whiplash and La La Land
 Nicole Chesney, artist
 George M. Cohan, songwriter and entertainer, composed "I'm a Yankee Doodle Dandy" and "You're a Grand Old Flag"
 Bill Conti, composer of music for film and television, including theme from Rocky
 Scott Corbett, writer of children's books
 Michael Corrente, film director and producer
 Pauly D, television personality, noted for contributions to the MTV program Jersey Shore.
 Christopher Denise, illustrator of children's books, including many in the Redwall series
 Bruce DeSilva, author of the Liam Mulligan series of mystery novels
 Paul Di Filippo, author of Steampunk Trilogy
 Ronald Dworkin, author, professor of constitutional law
 John Dwyer, multi-instrumentalist, primary songwriter and core member of Thee Oh Sees, visual artist, record label owner
 C. M. Eddy, Jr., author of mysteries and horror fiction
 Nelson Eddy, singer and film actor
 Susan Eisenberg, voice actress 
 Jeanpaul Ferro, poet, short fiction author, novelist
 Elisabeth Filarski, footwear designer, Survivor: The Australian Outback contestant
 Sage Francis, hip hop artist and slam poet
 Margaret Burnham Geddes, architect, activist, and urban planner
 Al Gomes, record producer and songwriter
 Roger A. Graham, lyricist, songwriter
 Robert Leo (Bobby) Hackett, jazz musician (trumpet, cornet, guitar)
 Scott Haltzman, author, The Secrets of Happily Married Men: Eight Ways to Win Your Wife's Heart Forever
 Scott Hamilton, tenor saxophonist
 Clay Hart, country musician (guitar)
 Richard Hatch, winner of Survivor: Borneo
 David Hedison, actor, star of Voyage to the Bottom of the Sea
 Greta Hodgkinson, ballet dancer
 Ruth Hussey, actress, Oscar-nominated for The Philadelphia Story (1940)
 Joe S. Jackson, sportswriter and editor
 Matilda Sissieretta Joyner Jones (1868–1933), pioneering black soprano who played to audiences around the world
 Claudia Jordan, actress, Miss Rhode Island USA 1997
 Galway Kinnell, Pulitzer Prize-winning poet
 Jesse Leach, vocalist and musician, original frontman of Killswitch Engage, Seemless, The Empire Shall Fall and Times of Grace
 James Sullivan Lincoln (1811–1888), "Father of Rhode Island Art" and first president of the Providence Art Club
 H. P. Lovecraft (1890–1937), author of fantasy and horror fiction
 Dorothy Lovett, actress
 Albert Lythgoe (1868–1934), archaeologist and curator of the Metropolitan Museum of Art
 Dodge MacKnight, painter
 George Macready, actor, Gilda, Paths of Glory
 Jason Marsden, voice actor
 Cormac McCarthy, Pulitzer Prize-winning author, The Road, No Country for Old Men
 Shanna Moakler, 1992 Miss Rhode Island Teen USA, 1995 Miss New York USA and Miss USA
 Nico Muhly, composer
 Andy On, Chinese-American Hong Kong actor
 Jeffrey Osborne, lead vocalist with L.T.D.
 Monty Oum (1981–2015), animator for Rooster Teeth Productions; creator of RWBY
 Vincent Pagano, actor, screenwriter
 Don Pardo (1918–2014), NBC announcer since 1944, Saturday Night Live 1975–2014
 S. J. Perelman, humorist, author, and screenwriter
 Sylvia Poggioli, reporter for National Public Radio
 Ira Rakatansky (1919–2014), modernist architect
 Josh Schwartz, creator of television series The O.C.
 A. O. Scott, film critic for New York Times
 Chris Sparling, screenwriter and film director
 Daniel Sully, stage actor and playwright
 Benjamin C. Truman, war correspondent and author
 Meredith Vieira, television personality
 Sarah Helen Whitman, poet, possible inspiration for Edgar Allan Poe poems "To Helen" and "Annabel Lee"
 Mabel May Woodward (1877–1945), prominent impressionist painter and RISD faculty

Business

 Arunah Shepherdson Abell, publisher and philanthropist
 Everett M. "Busy" Arnold, comic-book entrepreneur and publisher
 Andrew Dexter Jr., financier of Exchange Coffee House
 Wylie Dufresne, chef 
 Alan Shawn Feinstein, finance expert and philanthropist; Feinstein High School in Providence is named in his honor
 A. O. Granger (1846–1914), American industrialist and soldier
 William Hamlin, entrepreneur and Rhode Island's first engraver
 Henry J. Steere, industrialist and philanthropist

Innovators

 Zachariah Allen, scientist and inventor, patented automatic cut-off valve for steam engines
 George Henry Corliss, inventor of the Corliss steam engine, which revolutionized industry by making steam-power cheaper than water-power for powering factories
 John Peirce, inventor who participated in the development of the telephone
 Andries van Dam, pioneer in the field of computer graphics and professor at Brown University

Military

 George K. Anderson, general
 George Andrews, Adjutant General of the U.S. Army from 1912 to 1914
 Israel Angell, colonel in the American Revolution
 Richard Arnold, Civil War general
 William Seaman Bainbridge, military physician, surgeon and gynecologist
 Charles L. Hodges, U.S. Army major general
 Albert Martin, defender of the Alamo
 Frank Wheaton, Civil War general

Politics

 Arunah Shepherdson Abell, creator of Philadelphia Public Ledger and Baltimore Sun newspapers
 Nelson W. Aldrich, U.S. Representative, U.S. Senator, grandfather of Vice President Nelson Rockefeller and father of Richard S. Aldrich
 Richard S. Aldrich, U.S. Representative
 Philip Allen, 22nd Governor of Rhode Island and U.S. Senator
 William Henry Allen, naval officer during War of 1812
 Zachariah Allen, scientist and inventor
 Jonathan Arnold, member of Continental Congress from Rhode Island
 Samuel G. Arnold, United States Senator from Rhode Island
 Edward Beard, U.S. Representative
 Grace Lee Boggs, social activist and feminist, known for work done in Detroit
 Jabez Bowen, federalist supporter, Deputy Governor of Rhode Island and Chief Justice of the Rhode Island Supreme Court
 John Brown, co-founder of Brown University, U.S. Representative
 John Chafee, Governor of Rhode Island, Secretary of the Navy, and United States Senator
 Zechariah Chafee, lawyer, academic and civil libertarian
 Vincent Cianci, longest-serving mayor in Providence history (1974–1984) and (1991–2002); city's first Italian-American mayor
 Thomas Davis, U.S. Representative
 Herbert F. DeSimone, Attorney General of Rhode Island and Assistant Secretary of Transportation
 Ray Fogarty, Rhode Island state representative
 Dwight Foster, U.S. Senator and U.S. Representative
 Theodore Foster, U.S. Senator
 J. Joseph Garrahy, 69th Governor of Rhode Island 
 Albert C. Greene, U.S. Senator and Attorney General of Rhode Island
 John Patrick Hartigan, Judge of United States Court of Appeals for the First Circuit and of United States District Court for the District of Rhode Island
 Nicole Love Hendrickson, chair of the Gwinnett County, Georgia Board of Commissioners
 Stephen Hopkins, nine-time Governor of Rhode Island and signer of Declaration of Independence
 David Jagolinzer, American litigation attorney, born in Providence.
 Elisha Jenkins, New York Secretary of State, Mayor of Albany
 Pat LaMarche, Green Party vice presidential candidate in 2004 and activist
 Oscar Lapham, U.S. Congressman
 Henry Lippitt (1818–1891), textile magnate, governor of Rhode Island, his Victorian mansion is one of the finest in Providence
 Audri Mukhopadhyay, Canadian diplomat 
 Dee Dee Myers, first female White House Press Secretary, served during Clinton administration
 John O. Pastore, Democratic politician, first Italian-American governor (1945–1950) and Italian-American senator (1950–1976) of Rhode Island
 John Rucho, Massachusetts state legislator and businessman, was born in Providence
 Pamela Sawyer, member of Connecticut House of Representatives
 Bruce Sundlun, 71st Governor of Rhode Island and businessman 
 Robert Tiernan, U.S. Representative and member of Rhode Island General Assembly
 Pat Toomey, U.S. Senator from Pennsylvania

Reformers

 Paulina Kellogg Wright Davis (1813–1876), abolitionist, suffragist, and educator
 Bertha G. Higgins (1872–1944), African American suffragist, civil rights activist and clubwoman
 Mary E. Jackson (1867–1923), African-American female suffrage activist, YWCA leader and writer, born in Providence and active in RI politics
 Marion Simon Misch (1869–1941), activist, teacher, writer, businesswoman

Science and medicine

 Martha H. Mowry (1818–1899), first woman physician in Rhode Island

Sports

 Bill Almon, player for eight MLB teams 
 Deon Anderson, NFL fullback
 Rocco Baldelli, MLB outfielder 
 Marvin Barnes, NBA player 
 Will Blackmon, NFL cornerback
 Paul Briggs, NFL player
 Jill Craybas, professional tennis player
 Ernie DiGregorio, NBA rookie of the year in 1974 
 William Butler Duncan II, leader in New York Yacht Club's long defense of the America's Cup
 Hobe Ferris, second baseman for the Boston Americans 
 Beverly Baker Fleitz, tennis player, 1955 Wimbledon singles and doubles finalist, French Open doubles champion
 Anita Foss, All-American Girls Professional Baseball League player
 Harold Gomes, boxer
 Matt Hyson, pro wrestler, better known as Spike Dudley
 Chris Ianetta, MLB catcher 
 Ray Jarvis, MLB pitcher 
 Marilyn Jones, All-American Girls Professional Baseball League player 
 Paul Konerko, MLB first baseman 
 Davey Lopes, player, coach for the Los Angeles Dodgers 
 Tom Lovett, MLB pitcher
 Peter Manfredo Jr., boxer 
 Bill Osmanski, College Football Hall of Fame 
 Chuck Palumbo, pro wrestler 
 Michael Parkhurst, soccer defender for USMNT

Others
 

Edward Francis Anhalt, professor, event promoter, and company founder

References

Providence
People